Marcel Gaillard may refer to:

Marcel Gaillard (Belgian footballer) (1927–1976), Belgian footballer who played in England for Tonbridge, Crystal Palace, Portsmouth and Weymouth
Marcel Gaillard (French footballer) (1923–2007), French footballer who played in France for RC Strasbourg, OGC Nice and US Valenciennes-Anzin